The Tuvalu Rugby Union, or TRU, is the governing body for rugby union in Tuvalu. It was established in 2007 and is a full member of the Federation of Oceania Rugby Unions (FORU), which is the regional governing body for rugby in Oceania.

Tuvalu participates in the Rugby Sevens competitions at the Pacific Games and the Oceania Sevens Championship.

See also

 Tuvalu national rugby sevens team
 Rugby union in Tuvalu

External links
 Tuvalu-Rugby-Union on facebook.com
 Tuvalu on OceaniaRugby.com

Reference list

Rugby union in Tuvalu
Rugby
Rugby union governing bodies in Oceania
Sports organizations established in 2007
2007 establishments in Tuvalu